Subramanian Anantha Ramakrishna (born 30 November 1972) is a professor of physics in Indian Institute of Technology Kanpur specializing in optics and condensed matter physics. He was awarded the Shanti Swarup Bhatnagar Prize for Science and Technology, India's highest prize for excellence in science, mathematics and technology, in the physical sciences category in the year 2016. Ramakrishna obtained M.Sc. degree from Indian Institute of Technology Kanpur in 1995 after pursuing the integrated 5-year M.Sc. programme and secured Ph.D. from Raman Research Institute, Bangalore, in 2001 for a thesis titled "Light transport and localization in Active and passive random media" written under the supervision of Prof. N. Kumar. He spent two years in Imperial College, London, as a postdoctoral researcher and joined Indian Institute of Technology Kanpur as an assistant professor in May 2003, where he now holds the position of professor. In July 2020, Prof. Ramakrishna took charge as Director of the CSIR-Central Scientific Instruments Organisation in Chandigarh on lien from IIT Kanpur.

Distinctions and honors
    FNASc: Elected Fellow of the National Academy of Sciences India, 2022 
    FIETE: Elected Fellow of the Institution of Electronics and Telecommunication Engineers, 2021
    Swarna Jayanti Fellowship 2012 by the Department of Science and Technology, India
    P.K. Kelkar Research Fellow at IIT Kanpur (2009–2012)
    Young Affiliate, Third World Academy of Sciences (2007–2012)
    Young Scientist Medal, Indian National Science Academy, Delhi (2007)
    Young Scientist, Indian Academy of Science, Bangalore (2004–2007)

References

1972 births
Living people
Indian condensed matter physicists